Allocotocerus is a genus of water beetles in the family Hydrophilidae, first described by Ernst Gustav Kraatz in 1883. The decision for synonymy is based on Hansen (1999).

The Australian beetles of this genus are found in Western Australia, the Northern Territory and Queensland.

Watts separates the three genera of Hydrophilidae (Amphiops, Allocotocerus, and Regimbartia) which occur in Australia, by describing species from the genus Allocotocerus as being black, of length 3.5—4.5 mm, having meso- and meta-tibiae with swimming hairs, normal eyes, and elytra as long as high and having almost no striae.

Species
(as listed by GBIF)
Allocotocerus bedeli 
Allocotocerus indicus 
Allocotocerus kapuri 
Allocotocerus leachii 
Allocotocerus magnus 
Allocotocerus mistus 
Allocotocerus muelleri 
Allocotocerus myronius 
Allocotocerus narayanus 
Allocotocerus nigellus 
Allocotocerus nitidus 
Allocotocerus punctatus 
Allocotocerus segrex 
Allocotocerus semirotundus 
Allocotocerus senectus 
Allocotocerus seriatus 
Allocotocerus simplex 
Allocotocerus sisarus 
Allocotocerus sobrinus 
Allocotocerus soesilae 
Allocotocerus striatopunctatus 
Allocotocerus subaeneus 
Allocotocerus subditus 
Allocotocerus subopacus 
Allocotocerus tibialis 
Allocotocerus tubipennis 
Allocotocerus yalumbaboothbyi

References

Hydrophilinae
Taxa described in 1883
Taxa named by Ernst Gustav Kraatz
Beetle genera